Trisulfane is the inorganic compound with the formula H2S3. It is a pale yellow volatile liquid with a camphor-like odor. It decomposes readily to hydrogen sulfide (H2S) and elemental sulfur.  It is produced by distillation of the polysulfane oil obtained by acidification of polysulfide salts.

References 

Hydrogen compounds
Inorganic sulfur compounds